Michael White (born 1941) is an Irish former Gaelic footballer who played for club side Rathkenny and at inter-county level with the Meath senior football team. He usually lined out as a right corner-back.

Honours

Meath
All-Ireland Senior Football Championship: 1967
Leinster Senior Football Championship: 1964, 1966, 1967, 1970
All-Ireland Junior Football Championship: 1962
Leinster Junior Football Championship: 1962

References

1941 births
Living people
Rathkenny Gaelic footballers
Meath inter-county Gaelic footballers
Winners of one All-Ireland medal (Gaelic football)